PSF is an abbreviation that may refer to:

Organisations

Political parties 
 French Social Party (Parti Social Français)
 French Socialist Party (Parti Socialiste Français)
 Palestinian Popular Struggle Front

 Peoples Students Federation, the youth wing of the Pakistan Peoples Party
 Provisional Sinn Féin
 Socialist Party without Borders (Parti Socialiste sans Frontières), a leftist party in Chad

Law enforcement 
 Puntland Security Force
 Public Security Forces the principal law-enforcement arm of the Bahraini Ministry of Interior

Business and companies 
 Professional service firm, a company offering consulting, legal, or other services
 Premium Standard Farms, Inc
 P.S.F. Records, a record label
 Pressed Steel Fisher

Other 
 Pakistan Science Foundation
Pharmaciens Sans Frontières
Pondicherry Science Forum
Python Software Foundation

Technology 
 PC Screen Font, a font format used in Linux systems
 Physical Storage Format, a data format for navigation data
 Portable Sound Format
 Progressive segmented frame, a scheme to handle progressive scan video using interlaced equipment
 Protein structure file for molecular dynamics, a chemical file format
 Point spread function, the response of an imaging system to a point source
 Protein Segment Finder
 Polysulfone
PSF, Potassium fluorosilicate, specifically when referring to phosphors.

Units 
 Price per square foot
 Pounds per square foot, a measure of pressure; see also Pounds per square inch

Other 
 Prolate spheroidal wave function
 Pennsylvania Shakespeare Festival
 Phelps Stokes Fund
 Pittsfield Municipal Airport (IATA airport code: PSF)
 Posterior spinal fusion